Dixy is the trade name of a well known chain of stores in Russia; a top retailer of food and general household merchandise. It may also refer to:

Businesses with the name 

 Dixy Chicken, an English fast food chain, founded in 1986, with outlets across the United Kingdom that specialize in preparing and serving halal chicken

People with the name 

 Dixy Ann Hepburn, Miss International 1971 contestant from Trinidad and Tobago
 Dixy Lee Ray (1914–1994), American scientist and politician who served as the 17th Governor of Washington

See also 
 Dixi (disambiguation)
 Dixie (disambiguation)
 Dixy, a surname